August Wilhelm (after 1812: von) Schlegel (8 September 176712 May 1845), usually cited as August Schlegel, was a German poet, translator and critic, and with his brother Friedrich Schlegel the leading influence within Jena Romanticism. His translations of Shakespeare turned the English dramatist's works into German classics. Schlegel was also the professor of Sanskrit in Continental Europe and produced a translation of the Bhagavad Gita.

Life

Schlegel was born in Hanover, where his father, Johann Adolf Schlegel, was a Lutheran pastor. He was educated at the Hanover gymnasium and at the University of Göttingen. Initially studying theology, he received a thorough philological training under Heyne and became an admirer and friend of Bürger, with whom he was engaged in an ardent study of Dante, Petrarch and Shakespeare. Schlegel met with Caroline Böhmer and Wilhelm von Humboldt. In 1790 his brother Friedrich came to Göttingen. Both were influenced by Johann Gottfried Herder, Immanuel Kant, Tiberius Hemsterhuis, Johann Winckelmann and Karl Theodor von Dalberg. From 1791 to 1795, Schlegel was tutor to Willem Ferdinand Mogge Muilman, the son of a Dutch banker, who lived at Herengracht 476 in Amsterdam.

In 1796, soon after his return to Germany, Schlegel settled in Jena, following an invitation from Schiller. That year he married Caroline, the widow of the physician Böhmer. She assisted Schlegel in some of his literary productions, and the publication of her correspondence in 1871 established for her a posthumous reputation as a German letter writer. She separated from Schlegel in 1801 and became the wife of the philosopher Schelling soon after.

In Jena, Schlegel made critical contributions to Schiller's Horen and that author's Musen-Almanach, and wrote around 300 articles for the Jenaer Allgemeine Litteratur-Zeitung. He also did translations from Dante and Shakespeare. This work established his literary reputation and gained for him in 1798 an extraordinary professorship at the University of Jena. His house became the intellectual headquarters of the "romanticists", and was visited at various times between 1796 and 1801 by Fichte, whose Foundations of the Science of Knowledge was studied intensively, by his brother Friedrich, who moved in with his wife Dorothea, by Schelling, by Tieck, by Novalis and others.

In 1797 August and Friedrich broke with Friedrich Schiller. With his brother, Schlegel founded the Athenaeum (1798–1800), the organ of the Romantic school, in which he dissected disapprovingly the immensely popular works of the sentimental novelist August Lafontaine. He also published a volume of poems and carried on a controversy with Kotzebue. At this time the two brothers were remarkable for the vigour and freshness of their ideas and commanded respect as the leaders of the new Romantic criticism. A volume of their joint essays appeared in 1801 under the title Charakteristiken und Kritiken. His play Ion, performed in Weimar in January 1802, was supported by Goethe, but became a failure.

In 1801 Schlegel went to Berlin, where he delivered lectures on art and literature; and in the following year he published Ion, a tragedy in Euripidean style, which gave rise to a suggestive discussion on the principles of dramatic poetry. This was followed by Spanisches Theater (2 vols, 1803/1809), in which he presented admirable translations of five of Calderón's plays. In another volume, Blumensträusse italienischer, spanischer und portugiesischer Poesie (1804), he gave translations of Spanish, Portuguese and Italian lyrics. He also translated works by Dante and Camões.

Early in 1804, he made the acquaintance of Madame de Staël in Berlin, who hired him as a tutor for her children. After divorcing his wife Caroline, Schlegel travelled with Madame de Staël to Switzerland, Italy and France, acting as an adviser in her literary work. In 1807 he attracted much attention in France by an essay in the French, Comparaison entre la Phèdre de Racine et celle d'Euripide, in which he attacked French classicism from the standpoint of the Romantic school. His famous lectures on dramatic art and literature (Über dramatische Kunst und Literatur, 1809–1811), which have been translated into most European languages, were delivered at Vienna in 1808. He was accompanied by De Staël and her children. In 1810 Schlegel was ordered to leave the Swiss Confederation as an enemy of the French literature. 

In 1812, he travelled with De Staël, her fiancé Albert de Rocca and her children to Moscow, St. Petersburg and Stockholm and acted as secretary of Jean Baptiste Jules Bernadotte, through whose influence the right of his family to noble rank was revived. After this, he joined again the household of Mme. de Staël until her death in 1817, for like Mathieu de Montmorency he was one of her intimates until the end of her life. Schlegel was made a professor of Indology at the University of Bonn in 1818, and during the remainder of his life occupied himself chiefly with oriental studies. He founded a special printing office for Sanskrit. As an orientalist, he was unable to adapt himself to the new methods opened up by Bopp. He corresponded with Wilhelm von Humboldt, a linguist. After the death of Madame de Staël, Schlegel married (1818) a daughter of Heinrich Paulus, but this union was dissolved in 1821.

Schlegel continued to lecture on art and literature, publishing in 1827 On the Theory and History of the Plastic Arts, and in 1828 two volumes of critical writings (Kritische Schriften). In 1823–30 he published the journal Indische Bibliothek. In 1823 edited the Bhagavad Gita, with a Latin translation, and in 1829, the Ramayana. This was followed by his 1832 work Reflections on the Study of the Asiatic Languages. Schlegel's translation of Shakespeare, begun in Jena, was ultimately completed, under the superintendence of Ludwig Tieck, by Tieck's daughter Dorothea and Wolf Heinrich Graf von Baudissin. This rendering is considered one of the best poetical translations in German, or indeed in any language. In 1826, Felix Mendelssohn, at the age of 17, was inspired by August Wilhelm's translation of Shakespeare's A Midsummer Night's Dream to write a homonymous concert overture. Schlegel's brother Friedrich's wife was an aunt of Mendelssohn. 

In 1835, Schlegel became head of the committee organising a monument in memory of Ludwig van Beethoven in Bonn, the composer's birthplace. Schlegel died in Bonn in 1845, three months before its official unveiling.

Evaluations
According to Encyclopædia Britannica Eleventh Edition,

Traugott Böhme, in his article for the 1920 Encyclopedia Americana, gives the following thoughts:

The 1905 New International Encyclopedia, in its article on Schlegel, gives the following opinions:

Honors
Elected a member of the American Antiquarian Society in 1836.

Portraits
Portrait of A. W. Schlegel by Albert Gregorius (1774–1853), 1817, in Coppet Castle (Switzerland)

Works
Ion (1803)
Rom Elegie (1805)
 Schlegel's Berlin lectures of 1801/1804 reprinted from manuscript notes by Jakob Minor (1884)
Poetische Werke (1811)
 Observations sur la langue et la littératures provençale (1818)
Bhagavad Gita (1823, Latin translation)
Kritische Schriften (1828, critical works)
Sämtliche Werke (1846–1848) (Collected Works) issued in twelve volumes by Eduard Böcking
Œuvres écrites en français (3 vols., 1846)
Opuscula Latine scripta (1848)

Translation
Schlegel's Shakespeare translations have been often reprinted. The edition of 1871–72 was revised with Schlegel's manuscripts by Michael Bernays. See Bernays's Zur Entstehungsgeschichte des Schlegelschen Shakespeare (1872); Rudolph Genée, Schlegel und Shakespeare (1903). Schlegel also translated plays by Pedro Calderón de la Barca, such as La banda y flor, which became the basis for E. T. A. Hoffmann's 1807 singspiel Liebe und Eifersucht.

A selection of the writings of both August Wilhelm and Friedrich Schlegel, edited by Oskar Walzel, will be found in Kürschner's Deutsche Nationalliteratur, 143 (1892).

Letters
Ludwig Tieck und die Brüder Schlegel. Briefe ed. by Edgar Lohner (München 1972)

Notes

References

Attribution

Further reading
Paulin, R. The Life of August Wilhelm Schlegel, Cosmopolitan of Art and Poetry, Cambridge: Open Book Publishers (2016) 
Rudolf Haym, Romantische Schule (1870; new ed., 1914)

Strauss, D. Fr., Kleine Schriften (1862)
Huch, Ricarda, ‘Blütezeit der Romantik (1899)Caroline, Briefe aus der Frühromantik (ed. by Erich Schmidt, 2 vols., 1913)
Sidgwick, Mrs. Alfred, Caroline Schlegel and her Friends (1889)
Bernays, M., Zur Entstehungsgeschichte des Schlegelschen Shakespeare (1872), new ed. Celtis Verlag, Berlin 2013, 
Genée, R., A. W. Schlegel und Shakespeare (1903)
Gundolf, F, Shakespeare und der deutsche Geist (1911)
Helmholtz, A. A., The Indebtedness of S. T. Coleridge to A. W. Schlegel'' (1907)
da Rocha Abreu, Manuel: Zwischenruf - Rassistisch. In: Frankfurter Rundschau, 17 January 2006, P. 26.

External links

Phelan, Anna Augusta von Helmholtz, 1907 
Francke, Kuno, Howard, William Guild, Schiller, Friedrich, 1913-1914 

Translating Shakespeare  - process and problems of translating the works of William Shakespeare, done by Schlegel

1767 births
1845 deaths
18th-century German writers
18th-century German male writers
19th-century German dramatists and playwrights
19th-century German male writers
German literary critics
German untitled nobility
German poets
German Indologists
German translators
German male poets
German male dramatists and playwrights
English–German translators
Spanish–German translators
Writers from Hanover
People from the Electorate of Hanover
Recipients of the Pour le Mérite (civil class)
Translators of William Shakespeare
University of Göttingen alumni
Academic staff of the University of Bonn
Coppet group
Members of the American Antiquarian Society